Nothobranchius thierryi, also known as the Togo killifish is a species of fish in the family Aplocheilidae found in Western Africa. This species is classified as the only member of the monospecific genus Fundulosoma by some authorities.

References

Nothobranchius
Endemic fauna of Tanzania
Monotypic fish genera
Freshwater fish genera
Fish described in 1924
Taxobox binomials not recognized by IUCN